Epiperipatus cratensis is a species of velvet worm in the family Peripatidae. This species varies from purple to white. Females of this species have 33 or 34 pairs of legs; males have 30 to 33 pairs. The type locality is in Ceará, Brazil.

References

Onychophorans of tropical America
Onychophoran species
Animals described in 2010
Taxa named by Alberto Brito